T. J. Hooker is an American police drama television program starring William Shatner in the title role as a 15-year veteran police sergeant. The series premiered as a mid-season replacement on March 13, 1982, on ABC and ran on the network until May 4, 1985. The show was then picked up for a further single season by CBS.

The supporting cast includes Adrian Zmed as rookie Officer Vince Romano; April Clough as Officer Vicki Taylor (Season 1 only), replaced by Heather Locklear as rookie Officer Stacy Sheridan (season 2 onwards); and Richard Herd as Captain Dennis Sheridan, portraying officers in the LCPD Academy Precinct of a fictional, unnamed California city. Toward the end of the show's second season, James Darren became a regular cast member as Officer Jim Corrigan.

Plot
The background of Sergeant Thomas Jefferson "T. J." Hooker is that he, up until recently, was a plainclothes LCPD Detective Sergeant whose partner was killed in the line of duty while he and Hooker were trying to stop a bank robbery. An angry Hooker becomes motivated to rid the streets of criminals like those who murdered his partner. Thus, he decides the only way to do so is return to his former position as a uniformed patrolman. Hooker is a combat veteran of the Vietnam War, serving in U.S. Army Special Forces during the early years of the U.S.'s involvement in the war.

In "The Protectors," the series' pilot/TV movie, Hooker, back in uniform, trains a group of police academy recruits, including those played by Richard Lawson, Brian Patrick Clarke, Kelly Harmon, and Adrian Zmed. Hal Williams plays a senior officer, and Richard Herd makes a brief appearance as Captain Dennis Sheridan, Hooker's tough but understanding superior. During most of the series, Hooker is partnered with brash, sometimes hot-headed young rookie Vince Romano (played by Zmed). Romano is also a combat veteran of the Vietnam War, serving in the Army Infantry towards the end of U.S. ground forces involvement in the war. Hooker acts as his mentor both professionally and socially. The age difference generally being the key hook of the partnership, the pair quickly became fast friends and a good team.

Outside of his work, Hooker is divorced as a result of his work putting a strain on his marriage, but he is friendly with his ex-wife Fran, a nurse. A ladies' man, Hooker is still trying to adjust to being single again. Lee Bryant was the original actress to portray Fran; the part is later played by Leigh Christian.

Hooker's tough, no-nonsense demeanor has him often clashing with station Captain Sheridan (Richard Herd), but he always got the job done and was highly respected as a result. Working behind the desk at the police precinct, Vicki Taylor (April Clough) is a female officer who continually dodges pick-up attempts by Vince Romano.  Introduced at the start of the second season was attractive Officer Stacy Sheridan (Heather Locklear), the daughter of Captain Sheridan, who attended the police academy. Initially brought in to replace Vicki, by the end of the season she had progressed to patrolling with Jim Corrigan (James Darren), another veteran cop much in the mold of Hooker.

From the third season onward, Hooker and Romano (Unit 4-Adam-30), and Stacy and Corrigan (Unit 4-Adam-16), usually worked closely together to tackle cases. The addition of Corrigan and Sheridan's partnership added an extra dimension to the show, sometimes with whole plots revolving around one or both of them.

For the final season, the series moved from ABC to a late-night slot on CBS. Along with the move, Adrian Zmed chose to leave the series to pursue other projects, leaving Hooker to patrol alone or to generally work as more of a trio with Stacy and Jim, often on undercover work.

With its blend of humor mixed with "on the streets" grittiness, the show proved popular. The first season ranked 28th in the Nielsen ratings, but subsequent seasons failed to repeat the same level of success. The third season saw a slight revamp (including the theme music being rearranged into a more pop-driven version), with Corrigan set into place as Stacy's partner, and Captain Sheridan being dropped into the background (appearing as 'Special Guest Star' in just a few third and fourth-season episodes). The recurring character of Hooker's new boss, Lieutenant Pete O'Brien, portrayed by Hugh Farrington, was added. Lt. O'Brien was a veteran detective who was wounded in the line of duty.  The injuries put him in a wheelchair but he still worked complex investigations and supervised officers. The stories started drifting toward a more straightforward cops-and-robbers fare.

Cast

 William Shatner as Sergeant Thomas Jefferson "T. J." Hooker (Seasons 1-5)
 Adrian Zmed as Officer Vincent "Vince" Romano (Seasons 1–4)
 April Clough as Officer Vicki Taylor (Season 1)
 Heather Locklear as Officer Stacy Sheridan (Seasons 2–5)
 Richard Herd as Captain Dennis Sheridan (main cast Seasons 1–2, occasional special guest star Seasons 3–4)
 James Darren as Police Officer III Jim Corrigan (Seasons 2–5)
 Hugh Farrington as Detective Lieutenant Pete O'Brien (Seasons 3–5)

Production

Background
The series was created by Rick Husky who had also worked on The Rookies for Aaron Spelling and Leonard Goldberg. The series was originally to be a reworking of that former cop show, this time called The Protectors. After the pilot, it was decided to focus the series on William Shatner's character and retitle it T. J. Hooker. The series initially set out to give a more "hands on", procedure-based view of police work than some of the more stylized cop shows of the 1970s and 1980s, evident in the very early episodes.

Setting
The LCPD Academy scenes were filmed at the Los Angeles Police Department Academy in Elysian Park. Though the series itself was produced in Burbank and filmed in the Los Angeles area, the setting was not disclosed throughout the show's entire run.

Hooker and Romano's radio call sign for their "black and white" was "4-Adam-30", and radio calls were very similar to those of Los Angeles Police Department, using three bursts of a 900 Hz tone, using LAPD-type radio codes, and the officers acknowledging with roger.

Vehicles
Vehicles used In the first, second and up to the fourth episode of the third season, Hooker drove a '77-'78 Dodge Monaco police package but afterwards he started driving a '79-'81 Dodge St-Regis usually powered by the much more anemic 318 or 360 Cid V8 as opposed to the 440 Cid V8 Monaco. By the Fourth season,when Hooker and his team needed an unmarked cruiser, they usually rolled around in a '82-'83 light blue Dodge Diplomat or a '77-'78 burgundy red Dodge Monaco. Hooker's personal car for the duration of the series was a '74 blue Ford Torino sedan. Romano's car was a gold Datsun 280z and Corrigan's ride was a silver and red Jeep CJ-5.

Cancellation and revival
T. J. Hooker was canceled by ABC in the summer of 1985 (the final episode was a proposed reworking of the series set in Chicago) but the series survived when CBS picked up the show and produced new episodes (still produced in Los Angeles) and one two-hour TV movie titled "Blood Sport". The new episodes were shown later at night as the first portion of the network's CBS Late Night program block, with each episode's runtime extended to 70 minutes (or one hour and ten minutes) to allow CBS affiliates time for increased availability for advertisements. The TV movie and the penultimate episode were both aired by CBS on May 21, 1986, with the finale one week later on May 28, 1986.  The season was produced on a much smaller budget and reused action sequences from the previous seasons.

Episodes

William Shatner is the only actor to appear in every episode of the series. Heather Locklear appeared in the second-highest number of episodes, appearing in 84 of the 90 episodes, after joining the cast's second season.

Broadcast

US and international syndication
Starting in 2005, the A&E Network re-broadcast the entire series, running one episode per weekday at 4:00 a.m. It is also available in a shortened format on The Minisode Network and full length episodes are available on Crackle. The Universal HD Channel started airing episodes in September 2010.  On October 9, 2010, the Sleuth network began a 24-hour T. J. Hooker marathon. In 2023, the MeTV+ network began airing the program.

In the United Kingdom, the show was originally broadcast by ITV starting in April 1983. Most regions broadcast episodes at 7:45 p.m. on Saturday evenings, later in a similar Friday evening slot. Some regions gave it a slot on a different day (southern region TVS, for example, typically ran it on Tuesday evenings), and not all regions broadcast the entire series, with some areas not progressing beyond the third or fourth seasons. Some regions also broadcast the later episodes - particularly those concerning a more adult or violent nature - as part of the night-time line-up during the advent of 24-hour broadcasting in the later 1980s. In 2002, Five ran the whole series through, in a weekday 11:00 a.m. slot. This run included every episode, although some were edited for content for the daytime slot. In 2009, digital channel Quest aired the series on a daily basis, although they only hold the rights to show the first three seasons. On 11 November 2019, series 1 began broadcasting on Sony Channel.

In Italy, the series started to air in 1983 on Canale 5. After his first run, it was often repeated through the years: first on Italia 1 (late afternoon or in the morning ) and then on Rete 4 (in the morning) and Fox Retro (in the evening). Recently, METOO a Sister station of WCIU-TV in Chicago began airing the show in a 2:00 p.m. timeslot.

In Japan, the series has been playing 1985 – 1988 on Nippon TV.

In Australia, the series has been playing reruns on the 7 Networks 3rd channel 7mate from 2012 to 2016.

In New Zealand, the series is being screened for the first time, as from May 13, 2013, on Sky Television's Jones! channel.

In September 2014, FamilyNet cable channel began carrying the series, which was remastered in the mid-2000s with a high definition version that originally aired on Universal HD. On June 26, 2017 FETV began airing the series weeknights at 10:00 p.m.

As of 2019, the show has been re-run in the UK and Ireland by Sony Channel.

Currently, in the U.S., the show airs late evenings on FETV.

High definition
Beginning on October 1, 2010, the series was rebroadcast on Universal HD to overwhelming success, quickly becoming one of the most successful series on the channel although the channel did not yet subscribe to Nielsen ratings. Due to the high ratings, the original film elements were re-mastered for high definition, and the program was cropped to a 1.78 aspect ratio to fill the screens of modern televisions.

Home media
Sony Pictures Home Entertainment has released the first two seasons on DVD in Region 1 and 2. Due to poor sales, no further seasons were released. This release has been discontinued and is out of print.

On August 27, 2013, Mill Creek Entertainment announced that it had acquired the rights to various television series from the Sony Pictures library, including T. J. Hooker. It subsequently re-released the first two seasons on DVD on April 1, 2014.

On April 5, 2017, it was announced that Shout! Factory had acquired the rights to the series and subsequently released T. J. Hooker – The Complete Series on DVD in Region 1 on July 18, 2017.

References

External links
 
 

1982 American television series debuts
1986 American television series endings
1980s American crime drama television series
1980s American police procedural television series
American Broadcasting Company original programming
CBS original programming
American television series revived after cancellation
English-language television shows
American action television series
Television series by Sony Pictures Television
Television series by Spelling Television
Fictional portrayals of the Los Angeles Police Department
Television shows set in Los Angeles